Burumoseria is a genus of beetles belonging to the family Chrysomelidae. It is distributed in the Oriental realm.

Species
The following three species are included in Burumoseria:
Burumoseria marginipennis (Medvedev, 2009) – Thailand
Burumoseria partita (Weise, 1922) – Buru
Burumoseria yuae Lee & Konstantinov, 2015 – Taiwan

References

Alticini
Chrysomelidae genera
Beetles of Asia
Taxa named by Ernő Csíki